Alone for the First Time is the second solo studio album by Canadian record producer Ryan Hemsworth. It was released on Last Gang Records and Secret Songs on November 4, 2014. Music videos were created for "Snow in Newark", "Too Long Here", and "Surrounded". The album was nominated for the 2015 Juno Award for Electronic Album of the Year.

Critical reception

At Metacritic, which assigns a weighted average score out of 100 to reviews from mainstream critics, Alone for the First Time received an average score of 72, based on 9 reviews, indicating "generally favorable reviews".

Felicity Martin of Clash gave the album an 8 out of 10, saying, "It's a sad record, but one that envelops you in a warm hug, wipes your eyes and plays with your hair." Jonah Bromwich of Pitchfork gave the album a 6.0 out of 10, commenting that "Alone for the First Time is the furthest he's pushed himself, and the growing pains on the album can be chalked up to the strain of trying new things, a kind of adolescent awkwardness that shows signs of maturing into something sophisticated and unique."

CMJ placed the album at number 3 on the "30 Best Albums of 2014" list.

Track listing

References

External links
 
 

2014 albums
Ryan Hemsworth albums
Last Gang Records albums